Hervé Guibert (14 December 1955 – 27 December 1991) was a French writer and photographer. The author of numerous novels and autobiographical studies, he played a considerable role in changing French public attitudes to HIV/AIDS. He was a close friend of Michel Foucault.

Early life and career
Guibert was born in Saint-Cloud, Hauts-de-Seine, to a middle-class family and spent his early years in Paris, moving to La Rochelle from 1970 to 1973.

After working as a filmmaker and actor, he turned to photography and journalism. In 1978, he successfully applied for a job at France's evening paper Le Monde and published his second book, Les Aventures singulières (published by Éditions de Minuit). In 1984, Guibert shared a César Award for best screenplay with Patrice Chéreau for L'homme blessé. Guibert had met Chéreau in the 1970s during his theatrical years. He won a scholarship between 1987 and 1989 at Villa Medicis in Rome with his friend, writer Mathieu Lindon. He described these years in L'Incognito, published in 1989.

Guibert's writing style was inspired by the French writer Jean Genet and, later, by the work of Austrian writer Thomas Bernhard. Three of his lovers occupied an important place in his life and work: Thierry Jouno, director of the International Visual Theatre for the deaf in Paris, whom he met in 1976; Michel Foucault, whom he met in 1977; and Vincent Marmousez, a teenager of fifteen who inspired his novel Fou de Vincent (published in English as Crazy for Vincent).

For a time in the 1980s Guibert was a reader at the institute for young blind in Paris, Institut National des Jeunes Aveugles, which led to his novel Des aveugles (published in English as Blindsight).

In January 1988 Guibert was diagnosed with AIDS. From then on, he worked at recording what was left of his life. In June the following year, he married Christine, the partner of Thierry Jouno, so that his royalty income would eventually pass to her and her two children. In 1990, Guibert publicly revealed his HIV status in his roman à clef À l'ami qui ne m'a pas sauvé la vie (published in English as To the Friend Who Did Not Save My Life). Nina Bouraoui in The Guardian described the book thus:
"In this book, he tells the story of his illness, AIDS, in the late 1980s. He tells of how life with the virus became an existential adventure, how it affected a generation, how it stole his friends and lovers, and how writing was for him a bulwark against death and destruction. It's the story of an era, a turning point – when AIDS transformed our relationship with desire and sexuality forever."
Upon publication, Guibert immediately found himself the focus of media attention, featured in newspapers and appearing on several television talk shows.

Two more books also detailing the progress of his illness followed: Le Protocole compassionnel (published in English as The Compassionate Protocol) and L'Homme au chapeau rouge (published in English as The Man in the Red Hat), which was released posthumously in January 1992, the same month French television screened La Pudeur ou l'impudeur, a home-made film by Guibert of his last year as he lost his battle against AIDS. Almost blind as a result of disease, he attempted to end his life by taking digitalin just before his 36th birthday, and died two weeks later.

Publications
 La Mort propagande, R. Deforges, Paris, 1977
  Propaganda Death, translated by Jeffrey Zuckerman in Written in Invisible Ink: Selected Stories, Semiotext(e), 2020
 Zouc par Zouc, Balland, (1978)
 Suzanne et Louise : roman-photo, Hallier, « Illustrations, » Paris, 1980
 L'Image fantôme, Minuit, Paris, 1981
  Ghost Image, translated by Robert Bonnono, Sun and Moon, 1996; University of Chicago Press, 2014
 Les Aventures singulières, Minuit, Paris, 1982
  Singular Adventures, translated by Jeffrey Zuckerman in Written in Invisible Ink: Selected Stories, Semiotext(e), 2020
 Les Chiens, Minuit, Paris, 1982
 Voyage avec deux enfants, Minuit, Paris, 1982
 Les Lubies d'Arthur, Minuit, Paris, 1983
  Arthur's Whims, translated by Daniel Lupo, Spurl, 2021
 L'Homme blessé : scénario et notes, screenplay by Patrice Chéreau, Minuit, Paris, 1983
 Le Seul Visage, photographies, Minuit, Paris, 1984
 Des aveugles, Gallimard, Paris, 1985  (Fénéon Prize, 1985)  
  Blindsight, translated by James Kirkup, Quartet, 1995
 Mes parents, Gallimard, Paris, 1986
  My Parents, translated by Liz Heron, Serpent's Tail, 1994
 "Vous m'avez fait former des fantômes", Gallimard, Paris, 1987
 Les Gangsters, Minuit, Paris, 1988
  The Gangsters, translated by Iain White, Serpent's Tail, 1991
 Mauve le Vierge : nouvelles, Gallimard, Paris, 1988
  Mauve the Virgin, translated by Jeffrey Zuckerman in Written in Invisible Ink: Selected Stories, Semiotext(e), 2020
 L'Image de soi ou l'Injonction de son beau moment ?
 Fou de Vincent, Minuit, Paris, 1989
  Crazy for Vincent, translated by Christine Pichini, Semiotext(e), 2017
 L'Incognito: roman, Gallimard, Paris, 1989
  Incognito, translated by Patricia Roseberry, Broadwater House, 1999
 À l'ami qui ne m'a pas sauvé la vie, Gallimard, Paris, 1990
  To the Friend Who Did Not Save My Life, translated by Linda Cloverdale, Serpent's Tail, 1993; Semiotext(e), 2020
 Le Protocole compassionnel, Gallimard, Paris, 1991
  The Compassion Protocol, translated by James Kirkup, Braziller, 1994
 La Mort propagande : et autres textes de jeunesse, R. Deforges, Paris, 1991
 Mon valet et moi : roman cocasse, Éditions du Seuil, Paris, 1991
  My Manservant and Me: Madcap Novel, translated by Jeffrey Zuckerman, Nightboat, 2022
 Vice, photographies de l'auteur, J. Bertoin, Paris, 1991
  Vice, translated by Jeffrey Zuckerman in Written in Invisible Ink: Selected Stories, Semiotext(e), 2020
 L'Homme au chapeau rouge, Gallimard, Paris, 1992
  The Man in the Red Hat, translated by James Kirkup, Quartet, 1995
 Cytomégalovirus, journal d'hospitalisation, Éditions du Seuil, Paris, 1992
  Cytomegalovirus: A Hospitalization Diary, translated by Clara Orban, University Press of America, 1996; Fordham University Press, 2015
 Le Paradis, Gallimard, Paris, 1992
  Paradise, translated by James Kirkup, Quartet, 1996
 Photographies, Gallimard, Paris, 1993
 Vole mon dragon : théâtre, Gallimard, « Le manteau d'Arlequin », Paris, 1994
 La piqûre d'amour : et autres textes ; suivi de La chair fraîche, Gallimard, Paris, 1994
  The Sting of Love, translated by Jeffrey Zuckerman in Written in Invisible Ink: Selected Stories, Semiotext(e), 2020
 Enquête autour d'un portrait : sur Balthus, preface by Éric de Chassey, Les Autodidactes, Paris, 1997
 Lettres d'Égypte : du Caire à Assouan, 19.., photographies de Hans Georg Berger, Actes Sud, « Voir et dire », Arles, 1995
 La photo, inéluctablement : recueil d'articles sur la photographie, 1977-1985, Gallimard, Paris, 1999
 Le Mausolée des amants : journal, 1976-1991, Gallimard, Paris, 2001
  The Mausoleum of Lovers, translated by Nathanaël, Nightboat, 2014
 Articles intrépides. 1977-1985, Gallimard, Paris, 2008
Herve Guibert: Voices of the Self, Liverpool University Press 1999
Written in Invisible Ink: Selected Stories, Semiotext(e), 2020

References

External links
 herveguibert.net, a website in French devoted to Guibert

1955 births
1991 deaths
People from Saint-Cloud
20th-century French journalists
French LGBT journalists
20th-century French writers
French diarists
French gay writers
AIDS-related deaths in France
Suicides by poison
Prix Fénéon winners
20th-century French male writers
French male non-fiction writers
20th-century diarists
20th-century French LGBT people